Miguel Ángel Klee Orellana (born 19 February 1977) is a Guatemalan professional football goalkeeper who plays for Rosario Quetzaltenango.

He is also a former member of the Guatemalan national team.

Club career
A rather short goalkeeper, Klee began his career with Cobán Imperial in 2003, and after one season with Deportivo Marquense, he joined Xelajú for the Apertura 2008-09 tournament. In 2009, he moved to Suchitepequez.

International career
Klee has made 21 appearances for the full Guatemala national football team, his debut coming in a friendly against El Salvador on March 31, 2004. He represented his country in 7 FIFA World Cup qualification matches. and was selected as a reserve goalkeeper for the 2005 CONCACAF Gold Cup.

His final international was an October 2005 World Cup qualification match against Costa Rica.

References

External links
 

1977 births
Living people
Guatemalan footballers
Guatemala international footballers
Deportivo Marquense players
Xelajú MC players
C.D. Suchitepéquez players
C.D. Malacateco players
2005 UNCAF Nations Cup players
2005 CONCACAF Gold Cup players
Association football goalkeepers